The Thaw is a Russian television series which debuted in 2013. Valery Todorovsky debuted as a TV director with it. The series is a melodrama about life in the Soviet Union during the Khrushchev Thaw, specifically about film artists of the age. Relational is that Todorovsky's father worked on film in roughly this era. In the West the series has been compared to Mad Men in terms of tone and visuals, though the subject and plots are quite different.

Plot
The series is set in 1961. Cameraman Viktor Khrustalyov is in a difficult situation; he is suspected of being involved in the death of his friend, talented screenwriter Kostya Parshin, who committed suicide during a drinking-bout. The authorities try to put Khrustalyov in prison by any means. Viktor needs to shoot the comedy "The Girl and the Brigadier" in order to get permission to make the film "Shards" after the wonderful scenario left from his deceased screenwriter friend. Young director Yegor Myachin wants to adapt this screenplay. Khrustalyov arranges him as a trainee to the venerable director Krivitsky for a comedy. In the same film act Khrustalev's ex-wife Inga and his young sweetheart Maryana, with whom Yegor Myachin is also in love.

Cast

Yevgeny Tsyganov — camera operator Viktor Khrustalyov
Aleksandr Yatsenko — director-trainee Egor Ilich Myachin
Anna Chipovskaya — student of the Moscow State University Mariana Pichugina
Viktoriya Isakova — actress Inga Vitalevna Khrustaleva
Mikhail Efremov — director Fyodor Andreevich Krivitsky
Svetlana Kolpakova — wife of Krivitsky Nadia
Jana Sexte — cameraperson Lusia Polynina
Pavel Derevyanko — actor Gennady Petrovich Budnik
Evgeny Volotsky — Mariana's brother, Tailor Alexander (Sancha) Pichugin
Nina Dvorzhetskaya — second director Regina Markovna
Victor Horinjak — actor Ruslan
Anna Kotova — make-up artist Lida
Paulina Andreeva — singer Dina
Vladimir Gostyukhin — director of Mosfilm Semyon Vasilievich Pronin
Vasily Mishchenko — investigator Tsanin
Andrei Smirnov — father of Viktor, Sergey Viktorovich Khrustalev
Larisa Malevannaya — grandmother Mariana Zoya Alexandrovna
Olga Shtyrkova — Khrustalev's daughter Asya
Fedor Lavrov — scriptwriter Kostya Parshin
Nadezhda Markina — costume designer Olga Filippovna
Valery Todorovsky — director
Duta Skhirtladze — director of the film Giya Revazovich Taridze
Evgeniya Khirivskaya — Larissa
Konstantin Chepurin — requisitor Arkady Vladimirovich Somov
Viktor Dobronravov — old friend of Khrustalev Peter
Sophia Kashtanova — Sophia Loren
Sergei Bondarchuk (junior) — Sergei Bondarchuk
Nikita Yefremov — Oleg Yefremov
Antonina Papernaya — Tatiana Samoilova
Alexander Sutskover — lawyer
Svetlana Nikiforova — make-up artist Zhenya
Anastasia Prokofieva — dresser Elena
Elena Melnikova — employee of the Model House
Olga Klebanovich — secretary Pronina Lidia Ivanovna
Nino Kantaria's — stepmother Victor Nina Khrustaleva
Anastasia Popova — actress Oksana
Fedot Lviv — requisitor Melon
Andrey Zavyuk — Inga's lover Pavel
Andrey Dushechkin — witness sound engineer
Victor Molchan's — husband Regina Markovna Sergey
Anastasia Zharkova — assistant to the director ("clapper")
Irina Obidina — conductor
Andrey Dudarenko — member of the artistic council Victor Moiseevich

Awards
2014 - TEFI Award:
Best TV film / TV series
TV producer of the season - Valery Todorovsky
Best actor of a television film / series - Mikhail Efremov
2014 - Golden Eagle Award:
Best TV series (more than 10 episodes)
Best male role on television - Evgeny Tsyganov (for the role of Viktor Khrustalyov)
Best female role on television - Victoria Isakova (for the role of Inga Khrustalyova)
2015 - Award of the Government of the Russian Federation in the Field of Culture:
For the creation of the television series "The Thaw" - Valery Todorovsky, Dmitry Konstantinov, Alyona Zvantsova, Victoria Isakova, Evgeny Tsyganov

References

External links

2010s Russian television series
2013 Russian television series debuts
2013 Russian television series endings
Russian drama television series
Channel One Russia original programming
Films directed by Valery Todorovsky
Russian biographical television series